Ernest Julius  Wunderlich (16 May 1859 – 11 April 1945) was an Australian arts patron, asbestos manufacturer, autobiographer/memoirist, metal goods manufacturer and tiles manufacturer.

Early life 
Wunderlich was born in Islington, London, England on 16 May 1859.

Business life 
Wunderlich founded a Wunderlich Limited in 1885 which specialised in Wunderlich decorative metal panels mostly used for ceilings.

Later life 
Wunderlich died in Bondi, Sydney, New South Wales on 11 April 1945.

He is the dedicatee of Alfred Hill's String Quartet No. 2.

See also

 Octavius Charles Beale
 William Henry Paling
 William Baillieu
 Theodore Fink
 Percy Grainger
 Henri Verbrugghen
 Joseph Bradley
 William Arundel Orchard
 George Rayner Hoff
 Sir Neville Cardus
 Sir William Dobell

References

Australian philanthropists
Australian businesspeople
Australian autobiographers
Australian people of English descent
Australian people of German descent
1859 births
1945 deaths